Pepa may refer to:
Pepa, Democratic Republic of the Congo, a village
Pepa Airport, an airstrip
PEPA or Performance Evaluation Process Algebra, a stochastic process algebra
PEPA (drug), an ampakine drug that is a potential nootropic
Pepa (musical instrument), a flute-like musical instrument from Assam
 or the Spanish Constitution of 1812

People with the nickname
Pepa (footballer) (born 1980), Portuguese footballer
Pepa (rapper), Jamaican-American rap & hip-hop artist, member of Salt-N-Pepa
Pepa Fernández (born 1965), Spanish journalist
Pepa Rus (born 1985), Spanish actress, humorist, and singer

People with the surname
 Avni Pepa (born 1988), Kosovar footballer
 Brunild Pepa (born 1990), Albanian footballer

See also
Joseph (name)
Pepe (disambiguation)